John Christian and Bertha Landrock Reichert House, also known as the Wineert-Gelm-Victorian House, is a historic residence located in Tipton, Iowa, United States. J.C. Reichert was a native of Bavaria who immigrated to Ohio in 1837 and moved to Tipton in 1855.  He and his brother, John Henry, were carpenters.  They became contractors and built numerous buildings in the area.  They expanded their business by adding a lumberyard, before they opened a hardware and farm implement business.  Reichert also served as a director of the Cedar County State Bank.  He hired New York City architect Samuel B. Reed to design his home.  It is a rare example of the Stick style in Iowa.

The house is a 2½ story frame structure built on a stone foundation.  The rectangular-shaped main block is capped with a steeply pitched cross gabled roof.  Attached to the main block is a 1½ story ell. A large, rectangular tower is prominent on the main facade, as is the front porch that ends in a pyramid shaped turret.  The Reicherts sold the house to Frank D. Wingert, a banker, in 1897 and moved to Cedar Rapids.  The house remained in the Wingert family until 1969.  It was listed on the National Register of Historic Places in 1991.

References

Houses completed in 1883
Tipton, Iowa
National Register of Historic Places in Cedar County, Iowa
Houses in Cedar County, Iowa
Stick-Eastlake architecture in Iowa
Houses on the National Register of Historic Places in Iowa
Victorian architecture in Iowa